Fruits: A Caribbean Counting Poem is a children's picture book written by Valerie Bloom and illustrated by David Axtell. In 1997 it won the Nestlé Smarties Book Prize Bronze Award.

Reception
Kirkus Reviews found that "Although authentic to the Patwa language, the pronunciations and cadences can, for unpracticed readers, result in a halting tempo rather than the intended rhythmic lilt." while Publishers Weekly saw that "Readers may need guidance deciphering some of the words" and "First-time illustrator Axtell gives ... evocation of the poem's lush tropical setting and brightly painted buildings offers a lively backdrop for Bloom's bouncy poem."  The BookTrust called it "A sumptuous book, with rich, vibrant and distinctive 
illustrations."

References

1997 children's books
1997 poems
1997 poetry books
British picture books
British poetry books
Caribbean culture
Children's poetry books